The R710 is a Regional Route in Free State, South Africa that connects Welkom with Bultfontein.

Route
Its north-eastern terminus is the R30 and R73 at Welkom (west of the town centre). It initially runs west, before bending south-west. It crosses the Sand River and the Vet River before entering Bultfontein, where it meets the southern terminus of the R719. Just after, it reaches its end at a junction with the R700 north of the town centre.

References 

Regional Routes in the Free State (province)